Walnut stuffed figs is a type of Turkish dessert. The ingredients are figs, warm water to soak the figs, walnuts, milk, water, sugar, butter, and walnuts for garnish (optional).

See also
Şekerpare
Revani
Baklava
Tulumba
Kabak tatlısı

References

Turkish desserts
Turkish cuisine dolmas and sarmas